Zeunerite is a green copper uranium arsenate mineral with formula Cu(UO2)2(AsO4)2•(10-16)H2O. It is a member of the autunite group. The associated mineral metazeunerite is a dehydration product of zeunerite.

Zeunerite occurs as a secondary mineral in the oxidized weathering zone of hydrothermal uranium ore deposits which contain arsenic. Olivenite, mansfieldite, scorodite, azurite and malachite are found in association with zeunerite.

It was first described in 1872 for an occurrence in the Schneeberg District, Erzgebirge, Saxony, Germany. It was named for Gustav Anton Zeuner (1828–1907).

References

Uranium(VI) minerals
Arsenate minerals
Copper(II) minerals
Tetragonal minerals
Minerals in space group 126